Guillaume Blot (born 28 March 1985 in Saint-Malo) is a French former racing cyclist, who competed professionally between 2009 and 2012 for the  and  teams.

Major results
2011
 1st Grand Prix de Fourmies
 1st Stage 3 Tour de Normandie

External links
COFIDIS cyclists

French male cyclists
1985 births
Living people
Sportspeople from Saint-Malo
Cyclists from Brittany